Niazi Chowk Metrobus Station is a Lahore Metrobus station in Lahore, Punjab, Pakistan, along south bank of the Ravi River at the intersection of Multan Road and Ravi Road.

See also
 Lahore Metrobus

References

Bus stations in Lahore
Transport in Lahore
Lahore Metro stations